Dendropsophus bifurcus (common name: Upper Amazon treefrog) is a species of frog in the family Hylidae. It is found in the upper Amazon Basin of Bolivia, Brazil, Colombia, Ecuador, and Peru.
Dendropsophus bifurcus is an abundant and widespread species that inhabits bushes in open forest and clearings. It breeds in permanent and temporary shallow ponds. Eggs are laid out of the water on leaves whereas the tadpoles develop in the water.

References

bifurcus
Amphibians of Bolivia
Amphibians of Brazil
Amphibians of Colombia
Amphibians of Ecuador
Amphibians of Peru
Amphibians described in 1945
Taxonomy articles created by Polbot